Lady Yi of the Jeonju Yi clan or posthumously called as Princess Jeonghwa, was the fifth child, second and youngest daughter of Yi Jachun and also a full younger sister of Yi Seonggye, the founder of Joseon dynasty. She also became the paternal aunt of Yi Banggwa and Yi Bangwon.

In 1392, her brother made a new dynasty, their father was granted royal title as King Hwan (환왕, 桓王; later Hwanjo (환조, 桓祖)) and their mother was granted the title as Queen Ui (의비, 懿妃; later Queen Uihye (의혜왕후, 懿惠王后)). Under Emperor Gojong of Korea's command, she then posthumously honoured as Princess Jeonghwa (정화공주, 貞和公主) in 1872. She married Jo Inbyeok, son of Jo-Don from Hanyang Jo clan (한양 조씨, 漢陽 趙氏). After Joseon dynasty was established, Jo then honoured as Internal Prince Yongwon (용원부원군).

Family
Father: Yi Jachun (이자춘) – son of Yi Chun and Lady Bak.
Mother: Lady Choe (최씨) – daughter of Choe Han-gi and Lady Yi.
Brother: Yi Seong-gye (이성계) – married firstly with Lady Han, then remarried with Lady Gang after the Joseon dynasty was established.
Husband: Jo In-byeok, Internal Prince Yongwon (조인벽 용원부원군) – son of Jo-Don and Lady Yi.
Adopted son (eldest&only son of In-byeok from his first wife): Jo-On, Internal Prince Hancheon (조온 한천부원군) – married firstly with Lady Jang, then remarried again with Lady Bak.
1st son: Jo-Yeon, Internal Prince Hanpyeong (조연 한평부원군) – married Lady Gim.
2nd son: Jo-Hu (조후)
3rd son: Jo-Sa (조사)
4th son: Jo-Bu (조부)
1st daughter: Lady Jo (조씨) – married Hwang Gil-won (황길원).
2nd daughter: Lady Jo (조씨) – married Im Maeng-yang (임맹양).

References

14th-century Korean people
Year of birth unknown
Year of death unknown
Date of birth unknown
Date of death unknown
Princesses of Joseon